American singer and songwriter Penny Ford has released two studio albums and 10 singles (as well as five as a featured artist). She has sold over 16 million records collectively as a solo artist and with Snap!

Albums

Solo

With Snap!

Singles

As featured artist

Album appearances

References

External links
 Pennye Ford Billboard Chart History
 Penny Ford Billboard Chart History

Discographies of American artists
Electronic music discographies
Pop music discographies
Rhythm and blues discographies